Salem Township, Illinois may refer to one of the following townships:

 Salem Township, Carroll County, Illinois
 Salem Township, Knox County, Illinois
 Salem Township, Marion County, Illinois

There is also:

 New Salem Township, McDonough County, Illinois
 New Salem Township, Pike County, Illinois

See also

Salem Township (disambiguation)

Illinois township disambiguation pages